Guzów  is a village in the administrative district of Gmina Orońsko, within Szydłowiec County, Masovian Voivodeship, in east-central Poland.

The Battle of Guzów took place there in 1607.

References

Villages in Szydłowiec County